Karin Anja Elisabet Lundqvist (born 7 June 1971 in Vaksala, Uppsala Municipality) is a Swedish actress. She studied at the Swedish National Academy of Mime and Acting 1995–99.

Selected filmography
2000 - Tillsammans
2002 - Stora teatern (TV)
2002–05 - Tusenbröder
2006 - Varannan vecka
2006 - Offside
2008 - Oskyldigt dömd (TV)
2010 - Våra vänners liv (TV)

References

External links

Swedish Movie Database

1971 births
Swedish actresses
Living people
People from Uppsala